Rosedale United Church is a United Church of Canada church in Toronto, Ontario. It is located at 159 Roxborough Drive in the city's Rosedale neighbourhood.

History
Rosedale United Church opened in 1914 as Northern Congregational Church. The congregation relocated to this location from a now-demolished church at 480 Church Street.  The building was completed in 1913 in the Gothic Revival style by architect John Gemmell.

In 1925, when the Congregational Church merged with the Methodist Church of Canada and two-thirds of the Presbyterian Church in Canada to form the United Church of Canada, the church was renamed Rosedale United Church.

In 2014, singer Gordon Lightfoot was married to Kim Hasse, his third and current wife, in the church.

See also
 List of United Church of Canada churches in Toronto

References

United Church of Canada churches in Toronto
20th-century United Church of Canada church buildings
Churches completed in 1913
Gothic Revival architecture in Toronto
Gothic Revival church buildings in Canada
Rosedale, Toronto